Elek Imredy (April 13, 1912 – October 12, 1994) was a Hungarian sculptor who emigrated to Vancouver, British Columbia, Canada in 1957. His most notable work is Girl in a Wetsuit, which is located in Stanley Park.

Early life 
Imredy worked for the railroad in Hungary and studied there with sculptors Sandor Boldogfai Farkas and Bela Ohman as well as painters Istvan Szonyi and Vilmos Aba Novak.

Notable works 

 Girl in a Wetsuit in Stanley Park, 1972.
 Statue of Matthew Baillie Begbie, "BCs notorious hanging judge", New Westminster Courthouse, 1981.
 12' bronze Lady of Justice, New Westminster courthouse.
 Seated statue of Christ and one of Madonna, Holy Redeemer College, Edmonton.
 Bronze bust of Dr. George Mercer Dawson, UBC and Riverside Foundation, Calgary.
 Bronze statue of Louis St. Laurent, Department of Public Works, Ottawa.
 Bust of Zoltán Kodály at Vancouver Academy of Music, 1983.
 Grand Trunk Railway president Charles Melville Hays in front of Prince Rupert City Hall.
 The Mariners' Memorial on the Prince Rupert harbour front.
 Bust of Major J.S. Matthews at the Vancouver Archives.
 Bust of child (Anthony Peter Maxwell), 1958.
Life-size bronze statue of world renown Nisga'a carver, Norman Tait (1941-2016). The piece was age progressed to look older than Norman was at the time in 1970's. The piece was cast from molds of Norman's body. On permanent display as part of First People's collection, Royal British Columbia Museum, Victoria BC.

See also 

 List of attractions and monuments in Stanley Park
 Public art in Vancouver

References

External links 

 Sculpture wearing a Canucks jersey with white towel.

1912 births
1994 deaths
Canadian sculptors
Hungarian sculptors
Artists from Budapest
Hungarian emigrants to Canada